MultiChoice is a South African company that operates DStv, a major satellite television service in Sub-Saharan Africa and GOtv, a minor service operating in over nine countries of this area and Showmax service. MultiChoice was formed out of the subscriber-management branch of the M-Net terrestrial pay television company, and broadcasts the full range of M-Net channels on the DStv service. MultiChoice is owned by the media conglomerate of the same name. One of the subsidiaries of MultiChoice is DStv Now, renamed as DStv App, a service that delivers television transmission to mobile devices such as laptops, smart phones and notebooks.

Formerly, MultiChoice had operations in the Scandinavian, Benelux, Italy, Eastern Europe, Greek & Cypriot regions under the Filmnet TV service, Egypt under CNE (Cable Network of Egypt), Middle East under Gulf TV and Arab Radio and Television Network & Thailand under UBC (United Broadcasting Corporation).

In 2020, MultiChoice had a total subscriber base of 20.1 million viewers throughout Africa, and Naspers asserted that MultiChoice was one of the fastest growing pay-TV operators globally.

History

Early years (1983–1991)
In 1983, Koos Bekker wrote a paper at Columbia University describing the idea that led to M-Net, and along with two others pitched the idea to Naspers, which acquired a 26% share, leading to Naspers executive Ton Vosloo serving as chair of the board. M-Net lost money in its first few years.

Expansion (1992–2017)
In 1993, M-Net was divided into two divisions, one focused on transmission of the entertainment channels and the other on cellphone operations, signal distribution and subscriber management. This second division became MultiChoice. The company had been granted a licence to broadcast into Namibia in 1991 and, as a result, in 1996 MultiChoice Africa was established.

In 1992, analogue services were launched in 20 African countries and lasted until 1996 when digital services replaced them. This division, called DStv (Digital Satellite Television), had first been launched in South Africa on October 6, 1995, making it the first direct-to-home digital pay-TV service outside the US.

In 2002, a "Dual-view" decoder was launched by DStv which allowed the simultaneous viewing of two different channels from a single satellite feed. In 2006, a service to mobile devices was trialed and officially launched in 2011 as DStv Mobile (now called DStv App, renamed from DStv Now).

In October 2011, MultiChoice Nigeria launched GOtv, an affordable terrestrial platform & a compatriot to DStv, which broadcasts all channels from DStv Access and some from DStv Compact packages in 11 Sub-Saharan African countries.

MultiChoice broadcasts in 50 countries in Sub-Saharan Africa, including Cape Verde and Madagascar. Local language programme content is available in French and Portuguese in certain African territories, as well as the 11 official languages within South Africa.

IPO and consolidation (2018–)
In September 2018, Multichoice's parent company Naspers announced that it would separate its video entertainment business from the bulk of Naspers and list it separately on the Johannesburg Stock Exchange (JSE). The new company would be called MultiChoice Group and would include MultiChoice South Africa, MultiChoice Africa, Showmax Africa, and Irdeto. The listing took place on 27 February 2019, with share code MCG. The share was immediately eligible for inclusion in the JSE Top40, the list of the largest 40 shares by market capitalisation.

In October 2020, French media company Groupe Canal+ acquired 12% stake in MultiChoice.

In November 2020, MultiChoice acquired 20% stake in Nigeria's sports betting company, BetKing with plans to launch it in South Africa. In June 2021, they increased their stake to 49%.

As of September 13, 2022, French media company Groupe Canal+ retains a 26,26% stake in the company.

Composition

M-Net
M-Net is a satellite television subscription service which was established in 1986 and has since spawned into 9 affiliated channels – 3 for series and 5 for films/movies – including its flagship channel.
 
Showmax
Showmax is an online video-on-demand subscription service which was established in 2015.

SuperSport
SuperSport is a collection of sports channels broadcast on the DStv satellite and GOtv terrestrial services. It was established as a sports segment on the M-Net in 1988 and became an individual channel in 1995. It is affiliated with ESPN, Sky Sports and Fox Sports Australia and since 2003 has expanded to over 20 sports-and-leagues-specific TV channels. It also owns a football club called SuperSport United F.C.

DStv
DStv is a direct broadcast satellite service that was launched on 6 October 1995. It is currently available in 54 countries over Sub-Saharan Africa.

GOtv
GOtv is a digital terrestrial television platform that broadcasts in 11 African countries, including Nigeria, Ghana, Kenya, Uganda, Zambia, Namibia, Malawi, Mozambique among others. In Kenya, the M-PESA paybill number 423655 is used to pay for GOtv subscription via mobile money

Irdeto
Irdeto is a digital platform security company owned by MultiChoice to combat pay-TV piracy. Irdeto owns Denuvo.

BetKing
BetKing, a sports, gaming technology and entertainment company is a product of SV Gaming Limited.

Current projects and partnerships
Multichoice launched a streaming service called Showmax in 2015, which was subsequently enhanced for OTT services. On 19 September 2018, they announced that they would be launching a streaming version of DStv in 2019.

On 29 May 2018, MultiChoice South Africa and the University of Pretoria jointly announced that Multichoice would sponsor a Research Chair in Machine Learning at the University of Pretoria. The intention is to foster the development of skills in Artificial Intelligence and Machine Learning technology in South Africa. The sponsorship included bursaries for students in their final year and Honours projects through to Masters and PhD degrees in the fields of Engineering, Data Science or Computer Science.

Controversies

Ownership after JSE listing
The Independent Communications Authority of South Africa (ICASA) is the regulatory body for both telecommunications and broadcasting sectors. In February 2019, ICASA was dealing with a complaint, brought by non-profit organisation Khulisa Social Solutions (KSS), that the act of listing the MultiChoice Group is a breach of its broadcasting licence.

KSS claimed that the listing of MultiChoice Group on the JSE constituted a transfer of its individual broadcasting service licence from Naspers to the management and board of Multichoice, which required written permission from ICASA under the Electronic Communications Act. MultiChoice Group's answering affidavit stated that Multichoice had always been the licence holder, not Naspers and after the listing that situation would continue. The complaint had not been resolved prior to the listing of MultiChoice Group on the JSE.

Dominance of pay-TV market
ICASA released a preliminary report on 15 April 2019 regarding the dominance of Multichoice within the pay-TV market. The report suggested that a potential remedy would be the splitting up of rights to long-term contracts that are currently exclusive. This would make such content readily available for new entrants into the market. Multichoice is opposed to this in principle as it would threaten the viability of their income model.

Regulation of Netflix
Having lost 100,000 premium subscribers in the 2017/18 financial year, Multichoice called on ICASA to regulate Netflix and other OTT providers in the South African Pay-TV sector. Multichoice claims that Netflix has an unfair advantage over Multichoice as they do not pay tax in South Africa, do not employ anyone in South Africa and are not subject to the Black Economic Empowerment legislation of South Africa. Netflix responded that they intend to abide by local laws and taxes and were happy to collaborate with regulators. ICASA believes that they need to regulate Netflix and any Pay-TV monopolies.

See also
DStv
GOtv
Showmax
SuperSport

References

External links

Television in South Africa
Mass media companies of South Africa
Satellite television
Direct broadcast satellite services
Mass media in Johannesburg
Companies based in Johannesburg
Vivendi